Paul John Hilbert (March 24, 1949 – October 29, 2001) was an American politician who served in the Texas House of Representatives for District 150 from 1983 until his death in 2001.

Born in St. Louis, he graduated from Xavier University and South Texas College of Law. He died of cancer on October 29, 2001. He is interred at Sunset Memorial Park and Mausoleum in Affton, Missouri and has a cenotaph at Texas State Cemetery.

References

1949 births
2001 deaths
Politicians from St. Louis
South Texas College of Law alumni
Xavier University alumni
Members of the Texas House of Representatives
Deaths from cancer in Texas
20th-century American politicians